Minkema College is a secondary school in the city of Woerden, Netherlands. The school has two locations—on Minkemalaan  and on Steinhagenseweg —teaching all forms of Dutch secondary education.

Notable alumni

 KANKER WEIMER, multiple road and track cycling world champion
 Simon van der Geest, writer and poet
 Chris Krediet, Royal Air Force pilot

See also
Kalsbeek College
List of schools in the Netherlands

References

 .

Secondary schools in the Netherlands
Schools in Utrecht (province)
Woerden